Ninja Academy is a 1989 Nico Mastorakis' comedy film starring Will Egan, Gerald Okamura, Kelly Randall, Michael David,  Robert Factor, and Jeff Robinson.  It is a low-budget B-movie similar to the Police Academy series of movies.

Plot synopsis
Ninja Academy is the tale of the struggle between two ninja dojos for adults, Chiba's (played by Okamura) located out in the woods in Topanga Canyon and Chiba's former classmate Addleman's (Seth Foster) Beverly Hills Ninja Academy in Beverly Hills, California.

Attending this session at Chiba's dojo are stereotypical characterizations of a mime (Robinson), a James Bond-like secret agent (David), a Gung-ho military enthusiast (Factor), a klutz (Jack Freiberger), an immature rich college student named Josh (Egan), and two bimbos (Kathleen Stevens and Lisa Montgomery) who had selected the school because it had been rated number one by a martial arts magazine. Addleman and his students seek revenge on Chiba for stealing their number one ranking and the new students must defend the school while Josh romantically pursues his teacher, Chiba's daughter Gail (Randall).

As with many Mastorakis films, there is one scene that includes brief full frontal nudity.

Cast

 Will Egan as Josh
 Gerald Okamura as Chiba
 Kelly Randall as Gayle
 Michael David as Philip
 Jeff Robinson as The Mime
 Kathleen Stevens as Suzy
 Lisa Montgomery as Lynn
 Robert Factor as George
 Seth Foster as Adleman
 Jack Freiberger as Claude
 Art Camacho as Gonzales
 Al Lampkin as Mr. Keegan
 Michael Morano as Taxi Driver (as Michael Moreno)
 Deena Driskill as Phillip's Girl
 Orly Benyar as Phillip's Girl

External links
 
 

1989 action comedy films
Ninja films
American action comedy films
1989 films
Japan in non-Japanese culture
Films directed by Nico Mastorakis
1980s English-language films
1980s American films